The 1916 Louisiana gubernatorial election was held on April 18, 1916.  Like most Southern states between the Reconstruction Era and the Civil Rights Movement, Louisiana's Republican Party was virtually nonexistent in terms of electoral support.  This meant that the Democratic Party primary held on January 25 was supposed to be the real contest over who would be governor.  However, in this particular election Progressive Party nominee John M. Parker ran an unusually competitive campaign, garnering 37% of the general election vote.  The election resulted in the election of Democrat Ruffin G. Pleasant as governor of Louisiana.

Results  
Democratic Party Primary, January 25General Election, April 18'''

References

1916
Louisiana
Gubernatorial
April 1916 events